Tess Arbez (born 1 December 1997) is an Irish alpine ski racer.

Biography
She competed at the 2015 World Championships in Beaver Creek, United States, in the giant slalom and in the slalom. Tess Arbez also competed in four other FIS Alpine World Ski Championships: in St Moritz, Switzerland, in 2017; in Åre, Sweden, in 2019, in  Cortina, Italy, in 2021 and Courchevel-Meribel in 2023. In 2018, she was the only female athlete competing for Team Ireland at the PyeongChang Winter Olympic Games. During the 2022 Winter Olympics in Beijing, she became the first Irishwoman to compete in a speed race at the Olympics ranking 42nd in the Super-G. She finished 48th in the slalom.

References

External links
 

1997 births
Irish female alpine skiers
Living people
Alpine skiers at the 2018 Winter Olympics
Alpine skiers at the 2022 Winter Olympics
Olympic alpine skiers of Ireland